The 1960 United States presidential election in Nevada took place on November 8, 1960, as part of the 1960 United States presidential election. State voters chose three representatives, or electors, to the Electoral College, who voted for president and vice president. All surrounding states (California, Arizona, Utah, Idaho, and Oregon) voted for Nixon.

Nevada was won by Senator John F. Kennedy (D–Massachusetts), running with Senator Lyndon B. Johnson, with 51.16% of the popular vote against incumbent Vice President Richard Nixon (R–California), running with United States Ambassador to the United Nations Henry Cabot Lodge, Jr., with 48.84% of the popular vote.

Although Nixon lost the state and the election, he would later win Nevada in both 1968 and 1972.

Results

Results by county

See also
United States presidential elections in Nevada

References

Nevada
1960
1960 Nevada elections